Hymenobacter paludis  is a bacterium from the genus of Hymenobacter which has been isolated from the marsh from the Banping Lake Wetland Park in Taiwan.

References

External links
Type strain of Hymenobacter paludis at BacDive -  the Bacterial Diversity Metadatabase

paludis
Bacteria described in 2016